Moulinet may refer to:
 A circular cut, in fencing; see fencing terminology
 Moulinet, Alpes-Maritimes, a French commune in the Alpes-Maritimes department
 Moulinet, Lot-et-Garonne, a French commune in the Lot-et-Garonne department